Sutton railway station was a station in Sutton, Cambridgeshire on the Ely and St Ives Railway.

The first station opened in 1866 but it became the goods station in 1878 when a new station was built on the new alignment for the extension to St. Ives. There was a signal box at the station. It was closed for regular passenger services in 1931 but was used for special excursion trains until 1958.

References

External links
 Sutton station on navigable 1946 O. S. map
 Sutton station on Subterranea Britannica

Former Great Eastern Railway stations
Disused railway stations in Cambridgeshire
Railway stations in Great Britain opened in 1866
Railway stations in Great Britain closed in 1931